Rhaphiomidas acton is a species of mydas flies (insects in the family Mydidae).

References

External links

 

Mydidae
Articles created by Qbugbot
Insects described in 1891